This is the results breakdown of the local elections held in Catalonia on 27 May 2007. The following tables show detailed results in the autonomous community's most populous municipalities, sorted alphabetically.

Overall

City control
The following table lists party control in the most populous municipalities, including provincial capitals (shown in bold). Gains for a party are displayed with the cell's background shaded in that party's colour.

Municipalities

Badalona
Population: 221,520

Barcelona

Population: 1,605,602

Cornellà de Llobregat
Population: 84,289

Girona
Population: 89,890

L'Hospitalet de Llobregat
Population: 248,150

Lleida
Population: 125,677

Mataró
Population: 118,748

Reus
Population: 101,767

Sabadell
Population: 200,545

Sant Cugat del Vallès
Population: 73,774

Santa Coloma de Gramenet
Population: 119,056

Tarragona
Population: 131,158

Terrassa
Population: 199,817

References

Catalonia
2007